The men's singles competition in artistic roller skating at the 2001 World Games in Akita was played from 22 to 23 August. The skating competition took place at Akita Prefectural Skating Rink.

Competition format
A total of 5 athletes entered the competition. Short programme and long programme were held.

Results

References

External links
 Results on IWGA website

Men's singles